Andrzej Mleczko (born 5 January 1949) is a Polish illustrator, mostly known for his satirical activities. He is also connected with painting, book illustrations, adverts, scenography and posters. He has worked with Polish and foreign magazines, in which he has published more than 15,000 of his drawings.

He graduated from the Faculty of Architecture of Cracow University of Technology.

In 1982 in Kraków he opened his own art gallery. He also opened his own gallery in 2002 in Warsaw.

In 2001 he co-hosted (with Paweł Pawlik) programme called Galeria Andrzeja Mleczki (Gallery of Andrzej Mleczko) on the radio station RMF FM . In 2003 he took part in Moja szkoła w Unii Europejskiej (My school in the European Union), a program promoting integration with the EU. He also received a Krakowska Książka Miesiąca (Cracovian Book of the Month) award in November 2008 for his book Seks, mydło i powidło.

He has made appearances in two of Olaf Lubaszenko's films: Chłopaki nie płaczą (Boys don't cry, 2000) and "E=mc²" (2002).

He has a daughter, Ewa and a grandson.

External links 
Official website

1949 births
Living people
Polish satirists
Polish male writers
People from Tarnobrzeg
Recipients of the Silver Medal for Merit to Culture – Gloria Artis
Tadeusz Kościuszko University of Technology alumni
Polish illustrators
Polish cartoonists